Ebionites (Ebionaioi, derived from Hebrew  (or ) ebyonim, ebionim, meaning 'the poor' or 'poor ones') as a term refers to a Jewish Christian sect, which viewed poverty as a blessing, that existed during the early centuries of the Common Era. The Ebionites embraced an adoptionist Christology, thus understanding Jesus of Nazareth as a mere man who, by virtue of his righteousness in following the Law of Moses, was chosen by God to be the messianic "prophet like Moses". A majority of the Ebionites rejected as heresies the  Orthodox Christian beliefs in Jesus' divinity, virgin birth and substitutionary atonement; and therefore maintained that Jesus was born the natural son of Joseph and Mary, sought to abolish animal sacrifices by prophetic proclamation, and died as a martyr in order to move all Israel to repentance.

Beyond voluntary poverty, the Ebionites were said to practice religious vegetarianism and ritual bathing. They insisted on the necessity of following the Written Law and Jesus' Sermon on the Mount; used one, some or all of the Jewish–Christian gospels, such as the Gospel of the Ebionites, as additional scripture to the Hebrew Bible; and revered James the Just as an exemplar of righteousness and the true successor to Jesus (rather than Peter), while rejecting Paul as a false apostle and an apostate from the Law.

Since historical records by the Ebionites are scarce, fragmentary and disputed, much of what is known or conjectured about them derives from the Church Fathers who saw certain Jewish Christians as Ebionites and confused different groups in their polemics whom they labeled heretical "Judaizers". Consequently, very little about the Ebionite sect or sects is known with certainty, and most, if not all, statements about them are speculative. The Church Fathers consider the Ebionites identical with other Jewish Christian sects, such as the Nazarenes.

Name
The hellenized Hebrew term Ebionite (Ebionai) was first applied by Irenaeus in the second century without making mention of Nazarenes (c.180 CE). Origen wrote "for Ebion signifies 'poor' among the Jews, and those Jews who have received Jesus as Christ are called by the name of Ebionites." Tertullian was the first to write against a heresiarch called Ebion; scholars believe he derived this name from a literal reading of Ebionaioi as 'followers of Ebion', a derivation now considered mistaken for lack of any more substantial references to such a figure. The term the poor (Greek: ptōkhoí) was still used in its original, more general sense. Modern Hebrew still uses the Biblical Hebrew term the needy both in histories of Christianity for "Ebionites" and for almsgiving to the needy at Purim.

History

Emergence
The earliest reference to a sect that might fit the description of the later Ebionites appears in Justin Martyr's Dialogue with Trypho (c. 140). Justin distinguishes between Jewish Christians who observe the Law of Moses but do not require its observance upon others and those who believe the Mosaic Law to be obligatory on all. Irenaeus (c. 180) was probably the first to use the term Ebionites to name a sect he labeled heretical "Judaizers" for "stubbornly clinging to the Law". Origen (c. 212) remarks that the name derives from the Hebrew word evyon, meaning 'poor'. Epiphanius of Salamis (c. 310–320 – 403) gives the most complete account in his heresiology called Panarion, denouncing eighty heretical sects, among them the Ebionites. Epiphanius mostly gives general descriptions of their religious beliefs and includes quotations from their gospels, which have not survived. According to the Encyclopædia Britannica, the Ebionite movement "may have arisen about the time of the destruction of the Jewish Temple in Jerusalem" (70 CE). The tentative dating of the origins of this sect depends on Epiphanius writing three centuries later and relying on information for the Ebionites from the Book of Elchasai, which may not have had anything to do with the Ebionites.

Paul talks of his collection for the "poor among the saints" in the Jerusalem church, but this is generally taken as meaning the poorer members of the church rather than a schismatic sect.

The actual number of sects described as Ebionites is difficult to ascertain, as the contradictory patristic accounts in their attempt to distinguish various sects sometimes confuse them with each other. Other sects mentioned are the Carpocratians, the Cerinthians, the Elcesaites, the fourth century Nazarenes and the Sampsaeans, most of whom were Jewish Christian sects who held gnostic or other views rejected by the Ebionites. Epiphanius, however, mentions that a sect of Ebionites came to embrace some of these views despite keeping their name.

As the Ebionites are first mentioned as such in the second century, their earlier history and any relation to the first Jerusalem church remains obscure and a matter of contention. There is no evidence linking the origin of the later sect of the Ebionites with the First Jewish-Roman War of 66–70 CE or with the Jerusalem church led by James. Eusebius relates a tradition, probably based on Aristo of Pella, that the early Christians left Jerusalem just prior to the war and fled to Pella, Jordan beyond the Jordan River, but does not connect this with Ebionites. They were led by Simeon of Jerusalem (d. 107) and during the Second Jewish-Roman War of 115–117, they were persecuted by the Jewish followers of Bar Kochba for refusing to recognize his messianic claims. As late as Epiphanius of Salamis (310–403), members of the Ebionite sect resided in Nabatea, and Paneas, Moabitis, and Kochaba in the region of Bashan, near Adraa. From these places, they dispersed and went into Asia (Turkey), Rome and Cyprus.

According to Harnack, the influence of Elchasaites places some Ebionites in the context of the gnostic movements widespread in Syria and the lands to the east.

Disappearance
After the end of the First Jewish–Roman War, the importance of the Jerusalem church began to fade. Jewish Christianity became dispersed throughout the Jewish diaspora in the Levant, where it was slowly eclipsed by Gentile Christianity, which then spread throughout the Roman Empire without competition from Jewish Christian sects. Once the Jerusalem church was eliminated during the Bar Kokhba revolt in 135, the Ebionites gradually lost influence and followers. Some modern scholars, such as Hyam Maccoby, argue the decline of the Ebionites was due to marginalization and persecution by both Jews and Christians. However, Maccoby's views expressed in his works from the 1980s and ’90s have been almost universally rejected by scholars. Following the defeat of the rebellion and the expulsion of Jews from Judea, Jerusalem became the Gentile city of Aelia Capitolina. Many of the Jewish Christians residing at Pella renounced their Jewish practices at this time and joined to the mainstream Christian church. Those who remained at Pella and continued in obedience to the Law were labeled heretics. In 375, Epiphanius records the settlement of Ebionites on Cyprus, but by the fifth century, Theodoret of Cyrrhus reported that they were no longer present in the region.

The Ebionites are still attested, if as marginal communities, down to the 7th century. Some modern scholars argue that the Ebionites survived much longer and identify them with a sect encountered by the historian Abd al-Jabbar ibn Ahmad around the year 1000. There is another possible reference to Ebionite communities existing around the 11th century in northwestern Arabia in Sefer Ha'masaot, the "Book of the Travels" of Rabbi Benjamin of Tudela, a rabbi from Spain. These communities were located in two cities, Tayma and "Tilmas", possibly Sa`dah in Yemen. The 12th century Muslim historian Muhammad al-Shahrastani mentions Jews living in nearby Medina and Hejaz who accepted Jesus as a prophetic figure and followed traditional Judaism, rejecting mainstream Christian views. Some scholars argue that they contributed to the development of the Islamic view of Jesus due to exchanges of Ebionite remnants with the first Muslims.

Views and practices

Judaism, Gnosticism and Essenism
Most patristic sources portray the Ebionites as Jews who zealously followed the Written Law alone (without the Oral Law), revered Jerusalem as the holiest city and restricted table fellowship only to Gentiles who converted to Judaism.

Some Church Fathers describe some Ebionites as departing from traditional Jewish principles of faith and practice. For example, Methodius of Olympus stated that the Ebionites believed that the prophets spoke only by their own power and not by the power of the Holy Spirit. Epiphanius of Salamis stated that the Ebionites engaged in excessive ritual bathing, possessed an angelology which claimed that the Christ is an angel of God who was incarnated in Jesus when he was adopted as the son of God during his baptism, denied parts of the Law deemed obsolete or corrupt, opposed animal sacrifice, practiced Jewish vegetarianism and celebrated a commemorative meal annually on or around Passover with unleavened bread and water only, in contrast to the daily Christian Eucharist. The reliability of Epiphanius' account of the Ebionites is questioned by some scholars. Modern scholar Shlomo Pines, for example, argues that the heterodox views and practices he ascribes to some Ebionites originated in Gnostic Christianity rather than Jewish Christianity and are characteristics of the Jewish Elcesaite sect, which Epiphanius mistakenly attributed to the Ebionites.

While mainstream biblical scholars do suppose some Essene influence on the nascent Jewish Christian church in some organizational, administrative and cultic respects, some scholars go beyond that assumption. Regarding the Ebionites specifically, a number of scholars have different theories on how the Ebionites may have developed from an Essene Jewish messianic sect. Hans-Joachim Schoeps argues that the conversion of some Essenes to Jewish Christianity after the Siege of Jerusalem in 70 CE may be the source of some Ebionites adopting Essene views and practices, while some conclude that the Essenes did not become Jewish Christians, but still had an influence on the Ebionites.

On John the Baptist
In the Gospel of the Ebionites, as quoted by Epiphanius, John the Baptist and Jesus are portrayed as vegetarians. Epiphanius states that the Ebionites had amended "locusts" (Greek akris) to "honey cake" (Greek ekris). This emendation is not found in any other New Testament manuscript or translation, though a different vegetarian reading is found in a late Slavonic version of Josephus' War of the Jews. Pines and other modern scholars propose that the Ebionites were projecting their own vegetarianism onto John the Baptist.

The strict vegetarianism of the Ebionites may have been a reaction to the cessation of animal sacrifices after the destruction of Jerusalem Temple in 70 CE and a safeguard against the consumption of unclean meat in a pagan environment. James Tabor, however, argues that Ebionite disdain for eating meat and the Temple sacrifice of animals is due to their preference for the ideal pre-Flood diet and what they took to be the original form of worship. In this view, the Ebionites had an interest in reviving the traditions inspired by pre-Sinai revelation, especially the time from Enoch to Noah.

On Jesus the Nazarene
The Church Fathers agree that some or all of the Ebionites rejected many of the precepts central to proto-orthodox Christianity, such as Jesus' divinity and virgin birth. The Ebionites are described as emphasizing the humanity of Jesus as the biological son of Joseph and Mary, who, by virtue of his righteousness in keeping the Mosaic law perfectly, was adopted as the son of God to fulfill the Hebrew scriptures.

Origen (Contra Celsum 5.61) and Eusebius (Historia Ecclesiastica 3.27.3) recognize some variation in the Christology of Ebionite sects; for example, that while all Ebionites denied Jesus' pre-existence, there was a sub-sect which did not deny the virgin birth. Theodoret, while dependent on earlier writers, draws the conclusion that the two sub-sects would have used different gospels. The Ebionites may have used only one, some or all of the Jewish–Christian gospels as additional scripture to the Hebrew Bible. However, Irenaeus reports that they only used a version of the Gospel of Matthew, which omitted the first two chapters (on the nativity of Jesus) and started with the baptism of Jesus by John the Baptist.

The Ebionites appear to have understood Jesus as the messianic "prophet like Moses" (foretold in Deuteronomy 18:15-19) who has come to proclaim the abolishment of animal sacrifices, rather than substituting himself for them through self-sacrifice. Consequently, Jesus is believed to have died as a martyr in order to move all descendants of the ancient Israelites to repentance by living immediately according to a radical ethic of inward and outward righteousness that will be standard in the Messianic Age.

Therefore, in order to become righteous, achieve communion with God and be saved from annihilation, the Ebionites insisted that both Jews and Gentile converts must observe all the commandments in the Written Law (except for those concerning animal sacrifice) and in Jesus' Sermon on the Mount with an emphasis on his "Culminations".

On James the Just
Among modern scholars, Robert Eisenman suggests that the Ebionites revered James the Just, brother of Jesus and leader of the Jerusalem church, as the true successor to Jesus (rather than Peter) and an exemplar of righteousness, and therefore they followed the permanent Nazirite vow that James had taken. One of the popular primary connections of the Ebionites to James is that the Ascents of James in the Pseudo-Clementine literature are related to the Ebionites. The other popularly proposed connection is that mentioned by William Whiston in his 1794 edition of Josephus, where he notes that we learn from fragments of Hegesippus that the Ebionites interpreted a prophecy of Isaiah as foretelling the murder of James.

Scholars, including Eisenman, Will Durant, Michael Goulder, Gerd Ludemann, John Painter and James Tabor, argue for some form of continuity of the Jerusalem church into the second and third centuries and that the Ebionites regarded James as their leader. Tabor argues that the Ebionites claimed a dynastic apostolic succession for the relatives of Jesus.

Conservative Christian scholars, such as Richard Bauckham, hold that James and his circle in the early Jerusalem church held a "high Christology" (i.e. Jesus was God incarnate) while the Ebionites held a "low Christology" (i.e. Jesus was a mere man adopted by God). As an alternative to the traditional view of Eusebius that the Jewish Jerusalem church gradually adopted the proto-orthodox Christian theology of the Gentile church, Bauckham and others suggest immediate successors to the Jerusalem church under James and the other relatives of Jesus were the Nazarenes who accepted Paul as an "apostle to the Gentiles", while the Ebionites were a later schismatic sect of the early second century that rejected Paul.

On Paul the Apostle
The Ebionites rejected the Pauline Epistles, and according to Origen they viewed Paul as an "apostate from the law". The Ebionites may have been spiritual and physical descendants of the "super-apostles" — talented and respected Jewish Christian ministers in favour of mandatory circumcision of converts — who sought to undermine Paul in Galatia and Corinth.

Epiphanius relates that the Ebionites opposed Paul, who they saw as responsible for the idea that Gentile Christians did not have to be circumcised or follow the Law of Moses, and named him an apostate. Epiphanius further relates that some Ebionites alleged that Paul was a Greek who converted to Judaism in order to marry the daughter of a high priest of Israel, but apostatized when she rejected him.

Writings
No writings of the Ebionites have survived outside of a few quotes by others and they are in uncertain form. The Recognitions of Clement and the Clementine Homilies, two third century Christian works, are regarded by general scholarly consensus as largely or entirely Jewish Christian in origin and reflect Jewish Christian beliefs. The exact relationship between the Ebionites and these writings is debated, but Epiphanius's description of some Ebionites in Panarion 30 bears a striking similarity to the ideas in the Recognitions and Homilies. Scholar Glenn Alan Koch speculates that Epiphanius likely relied upon a version of the Homilies as a source document. Some scholars also speculate that the core of the Gospel of Barnabas, beneath a polemical medieval Muslim overlay, may have been based upon an Ebionite or gnostic document. The existence and origin of this source continues to be debated by scholars.

John Arendzen classifies the Ebionite writings into four groups.

Gospel of the Ebionites
Irenaeus stated that the Ebionites used the Gospel of Matthew exclusively. Eusebius of Caesarea wrote that they used only the Gospel of the Hebrews. From this, the minority view of James R. Edwards and Bodley's Librarian Edward Nicholson claim that there was only one Hebrew gospel in circulation, Matthew's Gospel of the Hebrews. They also note that the title Gospel of the Ebionites was never used by anyone in the early church. Epiphanius contended that the gospel the Ebionites used was written by Matthew and called the "Gospel of the Hebrews". Because Epiphanius said that it was "not wholly complete, but falsified and mutilated", writers such as Walter Richard Cassels and Pierson Parker consider it a different "edition" of Matthew's Hebrew Gospel; however, internal evidence from the quotations in Panarion 30.13.4 and 30.13.7 suggest that the text was a gospel harmony originally composed in Greek.

Mainstream scholarly texts, such as the standard edition of the New Testament apocrypha edited by Wilhelm Schneemelcher, generally refer to the text Jerome cites as used by the Ebionites as the Gospel of the Ebionites, though this is not a term current in the early church.

Clementine literature
The collection of New Testament apocrypha known as the Clementine literature included three works known in antiquity as the Circuits of Peter, the Acts of the Apostles and a work usually titled the Ascents of James. They are specifically referenced by Epiphanius in his polemic against the Ebionites. The first-named books are substantially contained in the Homilies of Clement under the title of Clement's Compendium of Peter's itinerary sermons and in the Recognitions attributed to Clement. They form an early Christian didactic fiction to express Jewish Christian views, such as the primacy of James the Just, brother of Jesus; their connection with the episcopal see of Rome; and their antagonism to Simon Magus, as well as gnostic doctrines. Scholar Robert E. Van Voorst opines of the Ascents of James (R 1.33–71), "There is, in fact, no section of the Clementine literature about whose origin in Jewish Christianity one may be more certain". Despite this assertion, he expresses reservations that the material is genuinely Ebionite in origin.

Symmachus
Symmachus produced a translation of the Hebrew Bible in Koine Greek, which was used by Jerome and is still extant in fragments, and his lost Hypomnemata, written to counter the canonical Gospel of Matthew. Although lost, the Hypomnemata is probably identical to De distinctione præceptorum mentioned by Ebed Jesu (Assemani, Bibl. Or., III, 1). The identity of Symmachus as an Ebionite has been questioned in recent scholarship.

Elkesaites
Hippolytus of Rome reported that a Jewish Christian, Alcibiades of Apamea, appeared in Rome teaching from a book which he claimed to be the revelation which a righteous man, Elkesai, had received from an angel, though Hippolytus suspected that Alcibiades was himself the author. Shortly afterwards, Origen recorded a sect, the Elkesaites, with the same beliefs. Epiphanius claimed the Ebionites also used this book as a source for some of their beliefs and practices (Panarion 30.17). Epiphanius explains the origin of the name Elkesai to be Aramaic El Ksai, meaning "hidden power" (Panarion 19.2.1). Scholar Petri Luomanen believes the book to have been written originally in Aramaic as a Jewish apocalypse, probably in Babylonia in 116–117.

Religious and critical perspectives

Christianity
The mainstream Christian view of the Ebionites is partly based on interpretation of the polemical views of the Church Fathers, who portrayed them as heretics for rejecting many of the proto-orthodox Christian views of Jesus and allegedly having an improper fixation on the Law of Moses at the expense of the grace of God. In this view, the Ebionites may have been the descendants of a Jewish Christian sect within the early Jerusalem church which broke away from its proto-orthodox theology possibly in reaction to the Council of Jerusalem compromise of 50 CE.

Islam
Islam charges Christianity with having distorted the pure monotheism of the God of Abraham through the doctrines of the Trinity and through the veneration of icons. Paul Addae and Tim Bowes write that the Ebionites were faithful to the original teachings of the historical Jesus and thus shared Islamic views about Jesus' humanity and also rejected classic and objective theories of atonement, though the Islamic view of Jesus may conflict with the view of most Ebionites regarding the virgin birth, with Muslims affirming and Ebionites denying, according to Epiphanius and other church fathers.

Hans Joachim Schoeps observes that the Christianity which Muhammad, the prophet of Islam, was likely to have encountered on the Arabian peninsula "was not the state religion of Byzantium but a schismatic Christianity characterized by Ebionite and Monophysite views":

Judaism
The counter-missionary group Jews for Judaism favorably mentions the historical Ebionites in their literature in order to argue that "Messianic Judaism", as promoted by missionary groups such as Jews for Jesus, is Pauline Christianity misrepresenting itself as Judaism. In 2007, some Messianic commentators expressed concern over a possible existential crisis for the Messianic movement in Israel due to a resurgence of Ebionitism, specifically the problem of Israeli Messianic leaders apostatizing from the belief in the alleged divinity of Jesus.

See also

References

Literature

External links

 
Yahad Ebyoni: Ebionite Jewish Community (archived website of a modern Ebionite revival group founded by Shemayah Phillips in 1985)
The Ebionite Home Page by Allan Cronshaw -- Brother Of Jesus 

Christian terminology
Christianity and Judaism related controversies
Denial of the virgin birth of Jesus
Early Jewish Christian sects
Elcesaites
Heresy in ancient Christianity
Jewish religious movements
Nontrinitarian denominations
Patristics
Nature of Jesus Christ